"Only the Dead Fish Follow the Stream" is a song written by Louise Hoffsten, Stefan Örn and Sandra Bjurman, and performed by Louise Hoffsten at Melodifestivalen 2013, reaching the final where it ended up 5th with 85 points (36 from the international jury, 49 from the televoters).

Charts

References

2013 singles
Melodifestivalen songs of 2013
Songs written by Louise Hoffsten
Songs written by Sandra Bjurman
Songs written by Stefan Örn
2013 songs
Warner Music Group singles